The 1973 Campeonato Ecuatoriano de Fútbol Serie A, the first division of Ecuadorian football (soccer), was played by 12 teams. The champion was El Nacional.

First stage

Liguilla del No Descenso

Second stage

Liguilla Final

Semifinals

Finals

First leg

Second leg

References

External links
 Ecuador 1973 

1973
Ecu
Football